Allophyllum is a small genus of flowering plants in the phlox family known as false gillyflowers. These are hairy, glandular annuals with tall, thin, branching stems topped with clusters of small tubular flowers in varying shades of purple. Some of the plants are sticky, and all have seeds which become gluey when wet. False gillyflowers are native to western North America.

Species:
Allophyllum divaricatum - purple false gillyflower
Allophyllum gilioides - dense false gillyflower
Allophyllum glutinosum - sticky false gillyflower
Allophyllum integrifolium - white false gillyflower

External links
Jepson Manual Treatment

Polemoniaceae
Flora of North America
Polemoniaceae genera